Ancol Station is a railway station located in West Pademangan, Pademangan, North Jakarta, Indonesia. The station is situated on a railway junction where a line from Jatinegara connects to the Tanjung Priuk–Jakarta Kota railway. It is serving the Pink line KRL Commuterline from Jakarta Kota to Tanjung Priuk.

In the past, there were railway sidings heading to the Pasoso–Pertamina Cilincing depot from Ancol station but those have been closed since the 1990s.

Starting from 25 June 2016, Ancol Station was reactivated to serve KRL Commuterline trips from Jakarta Kota to Tanjung Priok.

The Provincial Government of Jakarta has proposed the construction of a new station, namely the JIS station, on the road plot between this station and Tanjung Priuk station. This proposal is being discussed together with the Directorate General of Railways. The station will be built to support access to the Jakarta International Stadium, as well as be integrated with the Jakarta LRT Northern Line plan.

Building and layout 
This station has four railroad tracks that have no turning tracks at all; consists of a double track with a double track on the north side leading from Jakarta Kota-Kampung Bandan and a double track on the south side leading from Rajawali.

Services

KRL Commuter Line 

Supporting transportation

References 

North Jakarta
Railway stations in Jakarta